Bluff Point Graded School No. 3 is a historic school building located near Kilmarnock, Northumberland County, Virginia.  It was built in 1912–1913, and is a one-story, two room balloon frame building. A rear kitchen and bathroom
addition was added in 1937. It features a wide front porch under the roof line. It was used as a schoolhouse until 1932, and subsequently adapted by the Bluff Point Methodist Church for use as The Community House.

It was listed on the National Register of Historic Places in 2009.

References

School buildings on the National Register of Historic Places in Virginia
School buildings completed in 1913
Buildings and structures in Northumberland County, Virginia
National Register of Historic Places in Northumberland County, Virginia
1913 establishments in Virginia